Paracanthella guttata is a species of tephritid or fruit flies in the genus Paracanthella of the family Tephritidae.

Distribution
Mongolia & China.

References

Tephritinae
Insects described in 1938
Diptera of Asia